Moussa Konaté (born May 16, 1978) is a French Muay Thai kickboxer who trains in Villiers-sur-Marne, France. Moussa Konaté is a professional Muay Thai kickboxer, he is coach in Villiers-sur-Marne, in his own club called KONATEAM. He is the former WAKO Pro European and World Muaythai champion.

Kickboxing career
He fought Bruno Bigot for the WAKO Pro World Muaythai title during Maxi Fight 1. Konaté won the fight by a fourth round TKO.

Moussa took part in an eight man Gala International De Boxe Thai 73 kg tournament. He beat Philippe Salmon by decision in quarter finals, Ludovic Millet by KO in the semifinals, but lost to Bakari Tounkara by KO in the finals.

Titles and accomplishments

2011 8 Men 73 kg Tournament Runner Up in Bagnolet, France (-73 kg)
2009 WAKO Pro World Muaythai Champion (-73 kg)
2009 T8 World Final Tournament Champion
2008 WAKO Pro European Muaythai Champion (-71 kg)
2004 WPKL World Kickboxing Champion
2003 French Kickboxing Champion
2002 WPKL World Kickboxing Champion
2002 French Kickboxing Champion
2001 French Kickboxing Champion

Muay Thai record

|-  bgcolor="#FFBBBB"
| 2012-04-28 || Loss ||align=left| Raphaël Llodra || Gala international de Boxe Thai & K1 Rules || Bagnolet, France || TKO || 3 || 
|-
|-  bgcolor="#FFBBBB"
| 2011-04-30 || Loss ||align=left| Bakari Tounkara || 8 Men 73 kg Tournament, Final || Bagnolet, France || KO || 2 || 
|-
! style=background:white colspan=9 |
|-
|-  style="background:#CCFFCC"
| 2011-04-30 || Win ||align=left| Ludovic Millet || 8 Men 73 kg Tournament, Semi Final || Bagnolet, France || KO || 2 || 
|-
|-  style="background:#CCFFCC"
| 2011-04-30 || Win ||align=left| Philippe Salmon || 8 Men 73 kg Tournament, Quarter Final || Bagnolet, France || Decision || 3 || 3:00
|-
|-  bgcolor="#FFBBBB"
| 2010-10-15 || Loss ||align=left| Farid Villaume || Maxi Fight 2 || Stade de l'Est, Réunion || Decision || 5 || 3:00
|-
|-  bgcolor="#FFBBBB"
| 2010-06-04 || Loss ||align=left| Bovy Sor Udomson || Ultimate Thai V / Muyathaitv Trophy || Paris, France || Decision || 5 || 3:00
|-
|-  bgcolor="#FFBBBB"
| 2010-04-24 || Loss ||align=left| Gregory Choplin || Fight Zone 4 || Villeurbanne, France || Decision (Unanimous) || 5 || 3:00
|-
|-  bgcolor="#c5d2ea"
| 2010-03-06 || Draw ||align=left| Ahmed Hassan || Muaythai Gala in Milizac || Milizac, France || Decision Draw || 5 || 3:00
|-
|-  bgcolor="#CCFFCC"
| 2009-10-09 || Win ||align=left| Bruno Bigot || Maxi Fight 1 || Stade de l'Est, Réunion || TKO (Doctor Stoppage) || 4 || 
|-
! style=background:white colspan=9 |
|-
|-  bgcolor="#CCFFCC"
| 2009-06-06 || Win ||align=left| Herbet Womaleu || Muaythai Gala in Angers || Angers, France || Decision || 5 || 3:00
|-
|-  bgcolor="#CCFFCC"
| 2009-04-25 || Win ||align=left| Gil Silva || De Villiers à Bangkok || Villiers-sur-Marne, France || Decision || 5 || 3:00
|-
! style=background:white colspan=9 |
|-
|-  bgcolor="#CCFFCC"
| 2009-01-31 || Win ||align=left| Sofiane Allouache || La Nuit des Titans IV, Final || Tours, France || TKO || 3 || 
|-
! style=background:white colspan=9 |
|-
|-  bgcolor="#CCFFCC"
| 2009-01-31 || Win ||align=left| Rachid Kabbouri || La Nuit des Titans IV, Semi Final || Tours, France || Decision || 3 || 2:00
|-
|-  bgcolor="#CCFFCC"
| 2009-01-31 || Win ||align=left| Yohan Lidon || La Nuit des Titans IV, Quarter Final || Tours, France || Decision || 3 || 2:00
|-
|-  bgcolor="#c5d2ea"
| 2008-12-20 || Draw ||align=left| Sudsakorn Sor Klinmee || K1 Survivor - Salle Carpentier || Paris, France || Decision Draw || 5 || 3:00
|-
|-  style="background:#c5d2ea"
| 2008-11-06 || Draw ||align=left| Djimé Coulibaly || Gala de Levallois || Levallois, France || Decision Draw || 5 || 3:00
|-
|-  bgcolor="#c5d2ea"
| 2008-06-07 || Draw ||align=left| Rafik Bakkouri || Gala in Bercy || Paris-Bercy, France || Decision Draw || 5 || 3:00
|-
|-  bgcolor="#CCFFCC"
| 2008-04-26 || Win ||align=left| Nicolas Germain || 5ème Gala de Pau || Pau, France || Decision || 5 || 3:00
|-
|-  bgcolor="#CCFFCC"
| 2008-03-08 || Win ||align=left| Flavio Santos || Muaythai à Villiers-sur-Marne || Villiers-sur-Marne, France || KO (Spinning back kick) || 4 || 
|-
! style=background:white colspan=9 |
|-
|-  bgcolor="#FFBBBB"
| 2008-02-09 || Loss ||align=left| Salahdine Ait Naceur || Les chocs de légende 2 || Saint-Ouen, France || Decision || 5 || 3:00
|-
|-  bgcolor="#CCFFCC"
| 2007-12-01 || Win ||align=left| Khadda Redouani || Gala de St Pryvé St Mesmin || Saint-Privé Saint-Mesmin, France || Decision || 5 || 3:00
|-
|-  bgcolor="#FFBBBB"
| 2007-11-09 || Loss ||align=left| Bruno Bigot || La Nuit des Défis || Saint-Denis, Réunion || Decision || 5 || 3:00
|-
|-  bgcolor="#FFBBBB"
| 2007-05-29 || Loss ||align=left| Cédric Muller || Fight Zone I || Villeurbanne, France || Decision || 5 || 3:00
|-
|-  bgcolor="#FFBBBB"
| 2007-04-07 || Loss ||align=left| Djimé Coulibaly || La Nuit des Supers Fights VII, Quarter Final || Villebon, France || Decision || 3 || 3:00
|-
|-  bgcolor="#CCFFCC"
| 2007-02-10 || Win ||align=left| Mohamed Bourkhis || La Nuit des Superfights VI || Villebon, France || TKO (Cut) || 5 || 
|-
|-  bgcolor="#c5d2ea"
| 2006-12-16 || Draw ||align=left| Rafik Bakkouri || La Nuit des Superfights V || Villebon, France || Decision Draw || 5 || 3:00
|-
|-  bgcolor="#FFBBBB"
| 2006-09-21 || Loss ||align=left| José Reis || A-1 Final 8 Ankara || Ankara, Turkey ||  ||  || 
|-
|-  bgcolor="#FFBBBB"
| 2006-04-22 || Loss ||align=left| Abdallah Mabel || Nuit du Muay Thaï et des Arts Martiaux || Pau, Pyrénées-AtlantiquesPau, France || Decision || 5 || 3:00
|-
|-  bgcolor="#CCFFCC"
| 2006-03-11 || Win ||align=left| Olivier Elisabeth || La 9ème Nuit des Boxeurs Thaï || Brest, France || Decision || 5 || 3:00
|-
|-  bgcolor="#CCFFCC"
| 2005-04-09 || Win ||align=left| Roman Logisch || SuperLeague Austria 2005 || Austria || Decision || 5 || 3:00
|-
|-  bgcolor="#FFBBBB"
| 2004-12-18 || Loss ||align=left| Peter Crooke || SuperLeague Netherlands 2004 || Netherlands || Decision || 5 || 3:00
|-
|-  bgcolor="#FFBBBB"
| 2004-03-20 || Loss ||align=left| Chris Van Venrooij || SuperLeague Italy 2004 || Italy || Decision || 5 || 3:00
|-
|-  bgcolor="#FFBBBB"
| 2003-09-27 || Loss ||align=left| Albert Kraus || SuperLeague Germany 2003 || Wuppertal, Germany || TKO (Corner Stop) || 2 || 3:00
|-
|-  bgcolor="#CCFFCC"
| 2003-05-10 || Win ||align=left| Noel Soares || SuperLeague Austria 2003 || Austria || Decision || 5 || 3:00
|-
|-  bgcolor="#FFBBBB"
| 2003-12-01 || Loss ||align=left| Nonthacsai Sitoo || Muaythai Gala || Helsinki, Finland || Decision || 5 || 3:00
|-
|-  bgcolor="#FFBBBB"
| 2002-07-07 || Loss ||align=left| Po Sai Por Patanachai || Muaythai Gala in Trieste || Trieste, Italy || Decision || 5 || 3:00
|-
|-  bgcolor="#FFBBBB"
| 2002-06-29 || Loss ||align=left| Farid Khider || Le Défi du Muaythai || Saint-Ouen, France || Decision (Unanimous) || 5 || 3:00
|-
|-
| colspan=9 | Legend:

See also 
List of male kickboxers

References

Living people
French male kickboxers
French Muay Thai practitioners
1978 births
French sportspeople of Malian descent
Sportspeople from Val-de-Marne